The Main is the longest tributary of the Rhine. The cities of Mainz and Wiesbaden are close to the confluence. 

The largest cities on the Main are Frankfurt am Main, Offenbach am Main and Würzburg. It is the longest river lying entirely in Germany (if the Weser-Werra are considered separate).

Geography
The Main flows through the north and north-west of the state of Bavaria then across southern Hesse; against the latter it demarcates a third state, Baden-Württemberg, east and west of Wertheim am Main, the northernmost town of that state.  

The upper end of its basin opposes that of the Danube where the watershed is recognised by natural biologists, sea salinity studies (and hydrology science more broadly) as the European Watershed.

The Main begins near Kulmbach in Franconia at the joining of its two headstreams, the Red Main (Roter Main) and the White Main (Weißer Main). The Red Main originates in the Franconian Jura mountain range,  in length, and runs through Creussen and Bayreuth. In its upper and middle section, the Main runs through the valleys of the German Highlands. Its lower section crosses the Lower Main Lowlands (Hanau-Seligenstadt Basin and northern Upper Rhine Plain) to Wiesbaden, where it discharges into the Rhine. Major tributaries of the Main are the Regnitz, the Franconian Saale, the Tauber, and the Nidda.

The name Main originates from Latin Moenis, Moenus or Menus. It is not related to the name of the city Mainz (Latin: Mogontiacum or Moguntiacum).

Navigation
Since 1992, the Main has been connected to the Danube via the Rhine-Main-Danube Canal and the highly regulated Altmühl river. The Main has been canalized with 34 large locks to allow CEMT class V vessels to navigate the total length of the river. The 16 locks in the adjacent Rhine-Main-Danube Canal and the Danube itself are of the same dimensions.

Weirs and locks 

There are 34 weirs and locks along the 380 km navigable portion of the Main, from the confluence with the Regnitz near Bamberg, to the Rhine.

 No.: Number of the lock (from upstream to downstream).
 Name: Name of the lock.
 Location: City or town where the lock is located.
 Year built: Year when the lock was put into operation (replacement dates are also listed where applicable).
 Main-km: Location on the Main, measured from the 0 km stone in Mainz-Kostheim. The reference point is the center of the lock or lock group.
 Distance between locks: length in km of impoundment (between adjacent locks).
 Altitude: height in meters above mean sea level of the upper water at normal levels.
 Height: Height of the dam in meters (the height of the Kostheim lock depends on the water level of the Rhine).
 Lock length: Usable length of the lock chamber in meters.
 Lock width: Usable width of the lock chamber in meters.

Hydroelectric power generation 
Most of the weirs or dams along the Main also have turbines for power generation.
 No.: Number of the dam/weir (from upstream to downstream).
 Name: Name of the dam/weir.
 Height: Height of the dam/weir in meters (the height of the Kostheim dam depends on the water level of the Rhine).
 Power: Maximum power generation capacity in megawatts.
 Turbines: Type and number of turbines.
 Operator: Operator of the hydroelectric plant.

Tributaries

Tributaries from source to mouth:

Left
 Regnitz
 Tauber
 Mümling

Right
 Rodach (Main)
 Itz
 Franconian Saale
 Aschaff
 Kahl
 Kinzig
 Nidda

Ports and municipalities
Around Frankfurt are several large inland ports. Because the river is rather narrow on many of the upper reaches, navigation with larger vessels and push convoys requires great skill.

The largest cities along the Main are Frankfurt am Main, Offenbach am Main and Würzburg. The Main also passes the following towns: Burgkunstadt, Lichtenfels, Bad Staffelstein, Eltmann, Haßfurt, Schweinfurt, Volkach, Kitzingen, Marktbreit, Ochsenfurt, Karlstadt, Gemünden, Lohr, Marktheidenfeld, Wertheim, Miltenberg, Obernburg, Erlenbach/Main, Aschaffenburg, Seligenstadt, Hainburg, Hanau, Hattersheim, Flörsheim, and Rüsselsheim.

The river has gained enormous importance as a vital part of European "Corridor VII", the inland waterway link from the North Sea to the Black Sea.

Main line

In a historical and political sense, the Main line is referred to as the northern border of Southern Germany, with its predominantly Catholic population. The river roughly marked the southern border of the North German Federation, established in 1867 under Prussian leadership as the predecessor of the German Empire.

The river course also corresponds with the Speyer line isogloss between Central and Upper German dialects, sometimes mocked as Weißwurstäquator.

Recreation
The Main-Radweg is a major German bicycle path alongside the river. Approximately , it is the first long-distance instance awarded 5 stars by the General German Bicycle Club (ADFC) in 2008. It starts from Creußen or Bischofsgrün and ends in Mainz.

Sights 
 Roman camp at Marktbreit

Notes and references
Footnotes

Citations

Bibliography
 Haus der Bayerischen Geschichte (ed.), Main und Meer - Porträt eines Flusses. Exhibition Catalogue to the Bayerische Landesausstellung 2013 (German). WBG. .

External links 

 Main River Website on the River Main by the Tourist Board of Franconia. 
 
 
 
 Water levels of Bavarian rivers
 Wasser- und Schifffahrtsdirektion Süd
 Main Cycleway
 Historical map of the Main confluence at Steinenhausen from BayernAtlas

 
Rivers of Hesse
Rivers of Bavaria
Rivers of Baden-Württemberg
Geography of Frankfurt
Federal waterways in Germany
Rivers of Germany